Đinh Viết Tú (born 16 August 1992) is a Vietnamese footballer who plays as a full back for V.League 1 club Nam Định.

Honours

Club
Nam Định F.C.
 V.League 2: 2017

References 

1992 births
Living people
Vietnamese footballers
Association football defenders
V.League 1 players
Nam Định F.C. players
Quang Nam FC players